1975 ACC tournament may refer to:

 1975 ACC men's basketball tournament
 1975 Atlantic Coast Conference baseball tournament